Hrachya Petikyan (born 23 February 1960) is an Armenian sports shooter and USSR, European, four-time World and Olympic Champion. Petikyan is a four-time Olympian who has represented three nations: the Soviet Union, the Unified Team and the Republic of Armenia. He has been awarded the Honored Master of Sport of the USSR title.

Petikyan started shooting in the Yerevan dynamo sports club under the honored coach of Armenia, Martyn Kalechyan. For many years, Petikyan was a member of the USSR national team and a Champion of Europe and the World in individual and team competitions. He has also won many medals at ISSF world competitions that are now discontinued.

At the 1988 Summer Olympics, competing as a Soviet, Petikyan participated in the 10 metre air rifle and the 50 metre rifle, three positions. He notably came in sixth place in the latter.

Petikyan was entrusted with carrying the Armenian flag at the 1992 Summer Olympics in Barcelona. He won the gold medal in the 50 metre rifle three positions and set the Olympic record at 1,267.4 in the finals. He also came in eighth place in the 50 metre rifle prone, meaning he had ranked in the top eight of every rifle competition at the Olympics.

Petikyan now began representing his native Armenia. He competed for Armenia at the 1996 Summer Olympics and 2000 Summer Olympics, each in his specialty, the men's 50 metre rifle three positions. However, he was unable to qualify for the finals at either Olympics.

In 1997, he headed the Armenian Shooting Federation and junior sports school for shooting in Armenia. In 2007, Petikyan participated in the ceremony to light the fire for the IV Pan-Armenian Games.

References

External links

1960 births
Living people
Sportspeople from Yerevan
Armenian male sport shooters
Honoured Masters of Sport of the USSR
Shooters at the 1988 Summer Olympics
Shooters at the 1992 Summer Olympics
Shooters at the 1996 Summer Olympics
Shooters at the 2000 Summer Olympics
Olympic shooters of the Soviet Union
Olympic shooters of the Unified Team
Olympic shooters of Armenia
Olympic gold medalists for the Unified Team
Olympic medalists in shooting
Soviet Armenians
Medalists at the 1992 Summer Olympics
Armenian sports executives and administrators
Ethnic Armenian sportspeople